Kavya K. Manyapu is an Indian–American aerospace engineer and scientist. She currently works at NASA in the Extravehicular Branch for Lunar Exploration missions (Artemis Program) within the Flight Operations Directorate at JSC. She was part of the Boeing team for nearly 10 years that developed the CST-100 Starliner spacecraft. She developed a fabric for self-cleaning space suits that uses carbon nanotubes to repel dust for use in future lunar and Mars missions.

Early life and career 
Manyapu grew up in Hyderabad, India. When she was 16, her family moved to the United States. She received a bachelor's degree in Aerospace Engineering from Georgia Institute of Technology in 2006 and a master's degree in aeronautics and astronautics from MIT in 2010. She also holds a diploma in performing arts from Potti Sreeramulu Telugu University. She served as a crew member on multiple Analog/simulated Mars Missions. She joined Boeing in 2010, where she has been working on the CST-100 Starliner, a spacecraft that would transport crew to the ISS. She held multiple roles in this project, including Spacesuit Integration Lead, Flight Test Engineer, Flight Crew Operations and Flight Test Director.

She received her PhD in 2017 under the supervision of Pablo de León, becoming the first ever PhD graduate in space studies at the University of North Dakota. During her PhD, she  developed patented novel technology, a smart fabric for planetary space suits to address the problem of lunar dust that proved to be a major issue during Apollo missions. The fabric contains carbon nanotubes, which repel dust when an electric current is applied to them. She holds five patents on this technology. Early-generation pieces of this fabric were launched into space for testing in April 2019  Manyapu became an Adjunct Professor of the Space Studies Department at the University of North Dakota in 2019.

Manyapu is a certified scuba diver and has a pilot's license.

Manyapu has received a number of awards for her work. In 2014, she received the Rotary National Award for Space Achievement Stellar Award. In 2016, she was one of nine people who won a Future Space Leader award. She was listed in 40 under 40 by Georgia State University in 2020

Selected publications

References 

1980s births
Living people
Year of birth uncertain
Indian aerospace engineers
University of North Dakota faculty
MIT School of Engineering alumni
Georgia Tech alumni
Boeing people
Indian women engineers
American aerospace engineers
American women engineers
American women academics
21st-century American women